Events from the year 1569 in art.

Events

Works

 Federico Barocci – Deposition (Perugia Cathedral)
 Joachim Beuckelaer – The Four Elements: "Water" and "Earth"
 Bronzino – The Martyrdom of St. Lawrence (fresco, Basilica of San Lorenzo, Florence)
 Lucas Cranach the Younger – The Vineyard of the Lord
 Gerardus Mercator – Nova et Aucta Orbis Terrae Descriptio ad Usum Navigantium Emendata
 Cristoforo Rosa (with his brother Stefano) – entry ceilings for Biblioteca Marciana, Venice
 Stradanus – Vanity, Modesty and Death
 Frescos in Studenica monastery

Births
Carlo Bononi, Italian painter of the School of Ferrara (died 1632)
Lucio Massari, Italy painter of the School of Bologna (died 1633)
Juan Bautista Mayno, Spanish painter of the Baroque period (died 1649)
Frans Pourbus the younger, Flemish painter (died 1622)

Deaths
September 9 – Pieter Brueghel the Elder, Netherlandish Renaissance painter and printmaker known for his landscapes and peasant scenes (born 1525)
date unknown
Vincenzo Cartari, Italian painter (born 1531)
Girolamo Mazzola Bedoli, Italian painter of the Parmesan School of Painting (born 1500)
Giovanni Battista Castello, Italian historical painter (born c. 1500)
1568/1569 - Jacob Binck, German engraver and painter (born between 1490-1504)

References

 
Years of the 16th century in art